The Piano Player is a jazz album by Ramsey Lewis, released in March 1970 on Cadet Records. The album reached No. 9 on the Billboard Best Selling Jazz LPs chart.

Overview 
The Piano Player was produced by Charles Stepney, Ramsey Lewis and Richard Evans and arranged by Stepney with Evans. The album was also recorded during November 1969 at Ter Mar Studios, Chicago.

Critical reception

According to MusicHound Jazz, "The fourth collaboration between Ramsey Lewis and Charles Stepney...has yet to be reissued in the CD format, but it was their best."

Track listing

Side 1 
 "The Distant Dreamer" (Stevie Wonder)
 "A Rainy Day in Centerville" (Charles Stepney)
 "Everybody's Talkin'" (Fred Neil)
 "Didn't We" (Jimmy Webb)
 "Whenever, Wherever" (Charles Stepney)

Side 2 
 "Close Your Eyes and Remember" (Charles Stepney)
 "You've Made Me So Very Happy" (Berry Gordy, Frank Wilson, Brenda Holloway, Patrice Holloway)
 "The Love I Feel for You" (Cleveland Eaton)
 "Time and Space" (Richard Evans)
 "Golden Slumbers" (John Lennon, Paul McCartney)
 "Do I Love Her" (Sylvia Moy, Stevie Wonder)

Personnel 
 Cleveland Eaton - bass
 Ramsey Lewis - piano, keyboards
 Maurice White - drums

Charts

References

Ramsey Lewis albums
1970 albums
Albums produced by Charles Stepney
Cadet Records albums